Péter Szényi (born 18 March 1987) is a Hungarian épée fencer, team world champion in 2013.

Career
Szényi took up fencing after coaches Gábor and Kornél Udvarhelyi came at his school for a sports recruitment event. His first coach was Bertalan Szőcs, who remains his master . He won a team silver medal in the 2006 Junior European Championships in Poznan and an individual silver medal in the 2008 U23 European Championships in Monza.

He joined the senior Hungarian team in 2011 and won with them a silver medal in the 2011 World Championships in Catania. The next year he climbed his first individual World Cup podium with a bronze medal in Buenos Aires. He took a team silver medal at the 2012 European Championships in Legnano, then at the 2013 edition in Zagreb. A few months later he earned a team gold medal in the World Championships at home in Budapest.

References

 Profile at the European Fencing Championships

1987 births
Living people
Hungarian female épée fencers
Fencers from Budapest
Universiade medalists in fencing
Universiade bronze medalists for Hungary
European Games competitors for Hungary
Fencers at the 2015 European Games
Medalists at the 2009 Summer Universiade
Medalists at the 2011 Summer Universiade